Sir John Young Stewart OBE  (born 11 June 1939), known as Jackie Stewart, is a British former Formula One racing driver from Scotland. Nicknamed the "Flying Scot", he competed in Formula One between 1965 and 1973, winning three World Drivers' Championships and twice finishing as runner-up over those nine seasons.

Outside of Formula One, he narrowly missed out on a win at his first attempt at the Indianapolis 500 in 1966, and competed in the Can-Am series in 1970 and 1971. Between 1997 and 1999, in partnership with his son, Paul, he was team principal of the Stewart Grand Prix Formula One racing team.

After retiring from racing, Stewart was an ABC network television sports commentator for both auto racing, covering the Indianapolis 500 for over a decade, and for several summer Olympics covering many events. Stewart also served as a television commercial spokesman for both the Ford Motor Company and Heineken beer.

Stewart was also instrumental in improving the safety of motor racing, campaigning for better medical facilities and track improvements at motor racing circuits.

After John Surtees' death in 2017, he is the last surviving Formula One World Champion from the 1960s. He is also the oldest living Formula One winner after Tony Brooks' death on 3 May 2022.

Early life
Stewart was born in Milton, Dunbartonshire, Scotland, a village fifteen miles west of Glasgow. Stewart's family were Austin, and later Jaguar, car dealers and had built up a successful business. His father had been an amateur motorcycle racer, and his brother Jimmy was a racing driver with a local reputation who drove for Ecurie Ecosse and competed in the 1953 British Grand Prix at Silverstone.

Jackie attended Hartfield primary school in the nearby town of Dumbarton, and moved to Dumbarton Academy at the age of 12. He experienced learning difficulties owing to undiagnosed dyslexia, and due to the condition not being understood or even widely known at the time, he was regularly berated and humiliated by teachers and peers alike for being "dumb" and "thick". Stewart was unable to continue his secondary education past the age of 16, and began working in his father's garage as an apprentice mechanic. He was not actually diagnosed with dyslexia until 1980, when his oldest son Mark was diagnosed with the condition. On learning that dyslexia can be genetically passed on, and seeing very similar symptoms with his son that he had experienced himself as a child, Stewart asked if he could be tested, and was diagnosed with the disorder, by which time he was 41 years old. He has said: "When you've got dyslexia and you find something you're good at, you put more into it than anyone else; you can't think the way of the clever folk, so you're always thinking out of the box."

At the age of 13 he had won a clay pigeon shooting competition and then went on to become a prize-winning member of the Scottish shooting team, competing in the United Kingdom and abroad. He won the British, Irish, Welsh and Scottish skeet shooting championships and twice won the "Coupe de Nations" European championship. He competed for a place in the British trap shooting team for the 1960 Summer Olympics, but finished third behind Joseph Wheater and Brett Huthart.

Stewart's first car was a light green Austin A30 with "real leather [covered] seats" which he purchased shortly before his seventeenth birthday for £375, a detail he was able to recall for an interviewer sixty years later. He had saved up the purchase price from tips received from his job at the family garage.

He took up an offer from Barry Filer, a customer of the family business, to test in a number of his cars at Oulton Park. For 1961, Filer provided a Marcos, in which Stewart scored four wins, and competed once in Filer's Aston DB4GT. In 1962, to help decide if he was ready to become a professional driver, he tested a Jaguar E-type at Oulton Park, matching Roy Salvadori's times in a similar car the year before. He won two races, his first in England, in the E-type, and David Murray of Ecurie Ecosse offered him a ride in the Tojeiro EE Mk2, and their Cooper T49, in which he won at Goodwood. For 1963, he earned fourteen wins, a second, and two-thirds, with six retirements.

In 1964, he again signed with Ecurie Ecosse. Ken Tyrrell, then running the Formula Junior team for the Cooper Car Company, heard of the young Scotsman from Goodwood's track manager and called up Jimmy Stewart to see if his younger brother was interested in a tryout. Jackie came down for the test at Goodwood, taking over a new, and very competitive, Formula Three T72-BMC which Bruce McLaren was testing. Soon Stewart was bettering McLaren's times, causing McLaren to return to the track for some quicker laps. Again, Stewart was quicker, and Tyrrell offered Stewart a spot on the team.

Racing career

In 1964 he drove in Formula Three for Tyrrell. His debut, in the wet at Snetterton on 15 March, was dominant; he took a 25-second lead in just two laps before coasting home to a win by 44 seconds. Within days, he was offered a Formula One ride with Cooper, but declined, preferring to gain experience under Tyrrell; he failed to win just two races (one to clutch failure, one to a spin) in becoming F3 champion.

After running John Coombs' E-type and practising in a Ferrari at Le Mans, he took a trial in an F1 Lotus 33-Climax, in which he impressed Colin Chapman and Jim Clark. Stewart again refused a ride in F1, but went instead to the Lotus Formula Two team. In his F2 debut, he was second at the difficult Circuit Clermont-Ferrand in a Lotus 32-Cosworth.

While he signed with BRM alongside Graham Hill in 1965, a contract which netted him £4,000, his first race in an F1 car was for Lotus, as stand-in for an injured Jim Clark, at the non-championship Rand Grand Prix in December 1964; after qualifying in pole position the Lotus broke in the first heat, but he won the second and claimed fastest lap. On his World Championship F1 debut in South Africa, he finished sixth. His first major competition victory came in the BRDC International Trophy in the late spring, and before the end of the year he won his first World Championship race at Monza, fighting wheel-to-wheel with teammate Hill's P261. Stewart finished his rookie season with a win, three seconds, a third, a fifth, and a sixth, and third place in the World Drivers' Championship. He also piloted Tyrrell's unsuccessful F2 Cooper T75-BRM, and drove the Rover Company's revolutionary turbine car at the 24 Hours of Le Mans alongside Graham Hill.

At the start of the 1966 season, Stewart won the Tasman Series from his BRM teammate Graham Hill in two-litre BRMs and also raced closely with his great rival and friend Jim Clark who was somewhat disadvantaged by an unreliable Lotus 39 which was let down by its old 2.5-litre Climax engine.

In F1, after his promising start the previous year, 1966 was a poor year for Stewart; the 3-litre H16 BRMs were unreliable, although Stewart did win the Monaco Grand Prix in a 2-litre engined car. The most significant event in that year was his accident at the Belgian Grand Prix at Spa-Francorchamps, which sparked his campaign to improve safety in F1 and caused him to miss the French Grand Prix at Reims.

Stewart had some success in other forms of racing during the year, winning the 1966 Rothmans 12 Hour International Sports Car Race and almost winning the Indianapolis 500 on his first attempt, in John Mecom's Lola T90-Ford, only to be denied by a broken scavenge pump while leading by over a lap with eight laps to go. However, Stewart's performance, having had the race fully in hand, sidelined only by mechanical failure, won him Rookie of the Year honours despite the winner, Graham Hill, also being an Indianapolis rookie. Stewart appeared at 24 Hours of Le Mans test day on 3 April 1966 driving a Ford GT40 Mk II version of Holman & Moody and the Ford GT40 owned by Alan Mann Racing.

BRM's fortunes did not improve in 1967, despite closely contesting the Tasman Series with Jim Clark who probably raced closer and harder with him than at any time in their careers. While Clark usually won, Stewart won a victory in the New Zealand Grand Prix with Clark attempting to run him down in the last laps with bodywork flying off his Lotus. In F1 the BRMs were still struggling with reliability problems and Stewart came no higher than second, at Spa, while having to drive one-handed while holding the car in gear with the other. In F2 he won events at Karlskoga, Enna, Oulton Park, and Albi in a Tyrrell-entered Matra MS5 or MS7. He also placed 2nd driving a works-entered Ferrari driving with Chris Amon at the BOAC 6 Hours at Brands Hatch, the 10th round of World Sportscar Championship at the time. Stewart also attempted to run the 1967 National 500 NASCAR race but did not qualify for the race.

For 1968 in Formula One, he switched to Tyrrell's Matra International team, where he drove a Matra MS10-Cosworth. After a promising start in South Africa with the Matra MS9 development mule he missed Jarama and Monaco due to an F2 injury at Jarama and his first win of the season was in heavy rain at Zandvoort. Another win in rain and fog at the Nürburgring followed, where he won by a margin of four minutes. He also won at Watkins Glen but his car failed at Mexico City, and so he lost the drivers' title to Hill.

In 1969, driving the Matra MS80-Cosworth, Stewart had a number of races where he completely dominated the opposition, such as winning by over two laps at Montjuïc, a minute in front at Clemont-Ferrand and by more than a lap at Silverstone. With additional wins at Kyalami, Zandvoort, and Monza, Stewart became world champion. Until 2005 he was the only driver to have won the championship in a car built by a French constructor and remains the only driver to win the world championship in a car built in France as well as in a car entered by a privateer team. Also that year, Stewart led at least one lap of every World Championship Grand Prix, and remains the only driver to achieve this feat.

For 1970, Matra insisted on using their own V12 engines, while Tyrrell and Stewart wanted to continue with the Cosworth and maintain their connection to Ford, which conflicted with Matra's recent connections to Chrysler. Tyrrell decided to build his own car and in the interim bought a chassis from March Engineering; Stewart took the March 701-Cosworth to wins at the Daily Mail Race of Champions and Jarama, but development on the car stalled and it was soon overcome by the Lotus team's new 72. The new Tyrrell 001-Cosworth, appeared in August and suffered problems but showed promise. Tyrrell continued to be sponsored by French fuel company Elf, and Stewart raced in a car painted French Racing Blue for many years. Stewart also continued to race sporadically in Formula Two, winning at Crystal Palace and placing at Thruxton. A projected Le Mans appearance, to co-drive the 4.5 litre Porsche 917K with Steve McQueen, did not come off, due to McQueen's inability to get insurance. He also had a one-off race in Can-Am, in the revolutionary Chaparral 2J. Stewart qualified third, in what was the car's first outing, but brake failure ended his race.

Stewart went on to win the Formula One world championship in 1971 using the Tyrrell 003-Cosworth, winning Spain, Monaco, France, Britain, Germany, and Canada. He also did a full season in Can-Am, driving a Carl Haas sponsored Lola T260-Chevrolet. During the 1971 season, Stewart was the only driver able to challenge the McLarens driven by Denny Hulme and Peter Revson. Stewart won two races, at Mont Tremblant and Mid Ohio, and finished 3rd in the championship.

The stress of racing year round and on several continents eventually caused medical problems for Stewart. He won the 1971 world championship despite having mononucleosis and crossing the Atlantic Ocean 186 times due to media commitments in the United States. During the 1972 Grand Prix season he missed the Belgian Grand Prix at Nivelles due to gastritis, and had to cancel plans to drive a Can-Am McLaren, but won the Argentine, French, U.S. and Canadian Grands Prix, to come second to Emerson Fittipaldi in the drivers' standings. Stewart also competed in a Ford Capri RS2600 in the European Touring Car Championship, with F1 teammate François Cevert and other F1 pilots, at a time where the competition between Ford and BMW was at a height. Their best result was at the 6 Hours of Paul Ricard, finishing second. In 1972 Stewart also received the OBE.

Entering the 1973 season, Stewart had decided to retire. He nevertheless won at South Africa, Belgium, Monaco and the Netherlands. His last and then record-setting 27th victory came at the Nürburgring with a 1–2 for Tyrrell. "Nothing gave me more satisfaction than to win at the Nürburgring and yet I was always afraid." Stewart later said. "When I left home for the German Grand Prix I always used to pause at the end of the driveway and take a long look back. I was never sure I'd come home again." After the fatal crash of his teammate François Cevert in practice for the 1973 United States Grand Prix at Watkins Glen, Stewart retired one race earlier than intended and missed what would have been his 100th Grand Prix. Stewart had already won the Drivers' Championship at the Italian Grand Prix two races previously; this was a race where Stewart had to come into the pits to change a flat tyre, and drove from 20th to finish 4th.

Stewart held the record for most wins by a Formula One driver (27) for 14 years until Alain Prost won the 1987 Portuguese Grand Prix, and the record for most wins by a British Formula One driver for 19 years until Nigel Mansell won the 1992 British Grand Prix. In his commentary work for race broadcaster Channel 9 during qualifying for the 1988 Australian Grand Prix, Stewart said that he had been asked numerous times if he was unhappy about losing his record to Prost, going on to say that he was happy that his record had been taken by someone of the calibre of Prost, as he believed him to be the best driver in Formula One.

Racing safety advocate
His steering column pinned his leg, while ruptured fuel tanks emptied their contents into the cockpit. There were no track crews to extricate him, nor were proper tools available. Stewart was rescued by fellow drivers Graham Hill and Bob Bondurant who had also crashed nearby. There were no doctors or medical facilities at the track, and Stewart was put in the bed of a pickup truck, remaining there until an ambulance arrived. He was first taken to the track's first aid centre, where he waited on a stretcher, which was placed on a floor strewn with cigarette ends and other rubbish. Finally, another ambulance crew picked him up, but the ambulance driver got lost driving to a hospital in Liège. Ultimately, a private jet flew Stewart back to the UK for treatment.

After his crash at Spa, Stewart became an outspoken advocate for auto racing safety. Later, he explained, "If I have any legacy to leave the sport I hope it will be seen to be an area of safety because when I arrived in Grand Prix racing so-called precautions and safety measures were diabolical."

Stewart campaigned with Louis Stanley (BRM team boss) for improved emergency services and better safety barriers around race tracks. "We were racing at circuits where there were no crash barriers in front of the pits, and fuel was lying about in churns in the pit lane. A car could easily crash into the pits at any time. It was ridiculous." As a stop-gap measure, Stewart hired a private doctor to be at all his races, and taped a spanner to the steering shaft of his BRM in case it would be needed again. Stewart pressed for mandatory seat belt usage and full-face helmets for drivers, which have become unthinkable omissions for modern races. Likewise, he pressed track owners to modernize their tracks, including organizing driver boycotts of races at Spa-Francorchamps in 1969, the Nürburgring in 1970 being joined by his close friend Jochen Rindt, and Zandvoort in 1972 until barriers, run-off areas, fire crews, and medical facilities were improved.

Some drivers and press members believed the safety improvements for which Stewart advocated detracted from the sport, while track owners and race organizers baulked at the extra costs. "I would have been a much more popular World Champion if I had always said what people wanted to hear. I might have been dead, but definitely more popular," Stewart later said.

Racing record

Career summary

 Graded drivers not eligible for European Formula Two Championship points

Complete British Formula Three results
(key) (Races in bold indicate pole position) (Races in italics indicate fastest lap)

Complete British Saloon Car Championship results
(key) (Races in bold indicate pole position; races in italics indicate fastest lap.)

Complete Formula One World Championship results
(key) (Races in bold indicate pole position, races in italics indicate fastest lap)

Non-championship Formula One results

(key) (Races in bold indicate pole position, races in italics indicate fastest lap)

Complete Tasman Series results
(key) (Races in bold indicate pole position; results in italics indicate fastest lap)

Non-championship Tasman Series results

Complete 24 Hours of Le Mans results

Indianapolis 500 results

Consultant

Subsequently, he became a consultant for Ford Motor Company while continuing to be a spokesman for safer cars and circuits in Formula One.

Commentator

ABC's Wide World of Sports and NBC Sportsworld
During the period 1971 to 1986, Stewart covered F1 races, NASCAR races and Indianapolis 500 as a color commentator, and also functioned as host for the latter. Jackie was a play-by-play announcer for the Luge at the 1976 Winter Olympics and the Equestrian at the 1976 Summer Olympics (partnered with Chris Schenkel) on ABC's Wide World of Sports. He was noted for his insightful analysis, Scottish accent, and rapid delivery, which once caused ABC's lead sports commentator Jim McKay to remark that Stewart spoke almost as fast as he drove. In his book Winning Is Not Enough, Stewart revealed that he used notes to read from to do a TV broadcast as he could not read from an autocue due to his dyslexia. He also revealed there was tension between him and ABC Sports producer Roone Arledge as Stewart was doing commercials for Ford Motor Company as well and several of the commercials aired on Wide World of Sports which he was a regular commentator there and that led him to leaving ABC in 1986.

Later, Stewart covered CART IndyCar races starting at Long Beach in 1987 on NBC SportsWorld, along with Paul Page. He returned in 1988, along with Charlie Jones. Stewart only covered road course and street races in his brief time at NBC. He did not return in 1989 and was replaced by Johnny Rutherford and Tom Sneva.

Australian and Canadian TV coverage
Stewart also worked on Australian and Canadian TV coverage, from late 1986 to the mid-1990s.

British TV coverage
Stewart occasionally appeared with Murray Walker as a co-commentator on the BBC's F1 coverage, including the British Grands Prix of 1979 and 1993.

Team owner

In 1997 Stewart returned to Formula One, with Stewart Grand Prix, as a team owner in partnership with his son, Paul. The team was a development of the previous Paul Stewart Racing team that had previously competed in lower formulae. As the works Ford team, their first race was the 1997 Australian Grand Prix. The only success of their first year came at the rain-affected Monaco Grand Prix where Rubens Barrichello finished second. The following year, 1998, was less competitive, with no podiums and few points.

However, after Ford acquired Cosworth in July 1998, the team risked designing and building a new engine for 1999. The SF3 was consistently competitive throughout the season. The team won one race at the European Grand Prix at the Nürburgring with Johnny Herbert, while Barrichello took three 3rd places, pole in France, and briefly led his home race at Interlagos. The team was later bought by Ford and became Jaguar Racing in 2000 (which subsequently became Red Bull Racing in 2005).

Stewart is also the head sports consultant/patron for the Royal Bank of Scotland. In March 2009, he waived his fee for the year in response to the bank losing £24bn in 2008.

Honours

Stewart received Sports Illustrated magazine's 1973 "Sportsman of the Year" award, the only auto racer to have won the title. In the same year he also won BBC Television's "Sports Personality of the Year" award, and was named as ABC's Wide World of Sports Athlete of the Year, which he was shared with American pro football player O. J. Simpson. In 1990, he was inducted into the International Motorsports Hall of Fame. In 1996, he was awarded an honorary doctorate by Heriot-Watt University in Edinburgh. In 1998 Stewart received an honorary doctorate from Cranfield University where he later served as chairman of the steering committee for the MSc Motorsport Engineering and Management.

He was a subject of the television programme This Is Your Life in January 1970 where he was surprised by Eamonn Andrews at Thames Television's Euston Road Studios.

In the 1971 Birthday Honours Stewart was created an Officer of the Order of the British Empire (OBE). In 2001 he received a knighthood. In both cases the honour was for services to motor racing.

In 2002 he became a founding patron of the Scottish Sports Hall of Fame and an inaugural inductee.

In 2003 the World Forum on the Future of Sport Shooting Activities presented Stewart the Sport Shooting Ambassador Award. The Award goes to an outstanding individual whose efforts have promoted the shooting sports internationally.

On 27 November 2008, Stewart was awarded an honorary Doctor of Science (D.Sc.) degree from the University of St Andrews.

On 26 June 2009, Stewart was awarded the Freedom of West Dunbartonshire at a special ceremony in his hometown of Dumbarton.

In 2010, Stewart was named as a founding member of Motor Sport magazine's Hall of Fame.

On 28 January 2012, Stewart gave the starting command for the 50th Anniversary of the Rolex 24 at Daytona. He assumed the role after previously announced Grand Marshal A. J. Foyt was forced to cancel his visit due to complications from his recent knee surgery.

In 2020, the British magazine The Economist ranked champion drivers by the relative importance of car quality to driver skill. According to this ranking, Stewart was the 4th best driver of all time.

Other appearances

Stewart appears in the 1966 John Frankenheimer movie Grand Prix doing all the driving scenes for actor Brian Bedford, who played Scott Stoddard, as Bedford did not know how to drive. Stewart was the subject in the 1972 Roman Polanski-produced film Weekend of a Champion, in which Polanski shadows him throughout a race weekend at the 1971 Monaco Grand Prix. 

He appeared in an anachronistic cameo in a 1977 episode of Lupin III as a competitor in the 1977 Monaco Grand Prix. George Harrison, a good friend of Stewart's, released a single, "Faster", in 1979, as a tribute to Stewart, Niki Lauda, Ronnie Peterson and fellow Formula One race car drivers.

He and his son Mark appeared together in a Vectrex commercial in the 1980s as a spokesman for the General Consumer Electronics (GCE)/Milton Bradley Vectrex home video game. Stewart also wrote the foreword for the book The Centenary of the Car 1885–1985 by Andrew Whyte in 1984. He participated in Prince Edward's 1987 charity television special, The Grand Knockout Tournament.

Stewart also featured in a special presentation video of the then all new Ford Mondeo in 1993, the video was given away free on the front cover of What Car? magazine in 1993. He was featured in the video to the 2000 song "Supreme" by British singer, Robbie Williams. Stewart appeared in several UPS commercials in 2002 and 2003 as a consultant for Dale Jarrett to convince Jarrett to "race the Big Brown truck". He also once appeared on the UK motoring program Top Gear as a driving instructor for host James May.

He is also interviewed in some depth in Martin Scorsese's 2011 documentary biography of Harrison, George Harrison: Living in the Material World. 2018 saw the 50th anniversary of the relationship between Stewart and luxury watch brand Rolex. 

In 2018, he Stewart appeared in US commercials for Heineken beer, in which he refused an offered beer saying "I'm still driving" before driving away in a Jaguar F-Type.

Helmet

Stewart's helmet was white, with the red, green, blue, white and yellow Royal Stewart tartan surrounding the top.

Personal life
Stewart has been married to his childhood sweetheart Helen McGregor since 1962, and they have two sons: Paul and Mark. Paul is a former racing driver, who later ran Paul Stewart Racing with his father, before selling it in 1999. Mark is a film and television producer. The couple currently live in the Buckinghamshire village of Ellesborough, on a 140-acre farm that was the hunting grounds of the nearby Prime Minister's country house, Chequers. Between 1969 and 1997 the couple lived in Begnins, near Lake Geneva in Switzerland (and later sold his house to Phil Collins).

Stewart dictated his autobiography titled "Winning Is Not Enough", due to his dyslexia. In a 2009 interview, and in the book, he discusses his close relationship with his older brother Jimmy, who was also a successful racing driver in his youth but had a long struggle with alcoholism. Jimmy died in 2008.

In 2018, he set up the charity Race Against Dementia. In 2016, Helen McGregor Stewart was diagnosed at the Mayo Clinic with frontotemporal dementia. , she has limited short-term memory and impaired mobility, and requires round-the-clock care support. Stewart believes that the application of Formula 1's technology and out of the box thinking could bring about earlier solutions to society coping with dementia.

See also
Sid Watkins
Grand Prix Drivers' Association

Footnotes

References

External links

The official web site of Sir Jackie Stewart, www.sirjackiestewart.com
International Motorsports Hall of Fame, Jackie Stewart
COLLAGE: Jackie Stewart's Grand Prix Album, a signed limited edition book
Grand Prix History – Hall of Fame , Jackie Stewart
The Scotsman newspaper, Heritage and Culture, "I risked my mother's wrath in order to be a driver"
 The Herald newspaper (Glasgow) , "Sir Jackie, was not diagnosed with dyslexia until he was 42"
 Jackie Stewart statistics
 
 Sunday Times article 13 September 2009
 

Formula One team owners
Formula One team principals
Formula One World Drivers' Champions
Formula One race winners
BRM Formula One drivers
Matra Formula One drivers
Tyrrell Formula One drivers
British Formula Three Championship drivers
British Touring Car Championship drivers
Indianapolis 500 drivers
Indianapolis 500 Rookies of the Year
12 Hours of Reims drivers
24 Hours of Le Mans drivers
BRDC Gold Star winners
International Motorsports Hall of Fame inductees
Tasman Series drivers
World Sportscar Championship drivers
Segrave Trophy recipients
Scottish businesspeople
Scottish Formula One drivers
Scottish racing drivers
Scottish sports broadcasters
Scottish male sport shooters
Scottish sportswriters
Skeet shooters
Knights Bachelor
People in sports awarded knighthoods
Officers of the Order of the British Empire
BBC Sports Personality of the Year winners
Motorsport announcers
Olympic Games broadcasters
Sportspeople from West Dunbartonshire
Scottish expatriates in Switzerland
People educated at Dumbarton Academy
Sportspeople with dyslexia
1939 births
Living people